Rowson's Reserve is a brand of Indian whisky, owned by Diageo, and launched on 3 October 2011. It is a blend of Indian grain whisky and aged Scotch whisky.

Rowson's Reserve's main competitors are Pernod Ricard's Blenders Pride and United Spirits Limited's Signature.

History
Rowson's Reserve was launched on 3 October 2011 in Maharashtra, Haryana, Punjab and Karnataka. The launch marked Diageo's return to the Indian Made Foreign Liquor (IMFL) market, in which it had been inactive since 2002.

References

External links
 Diageo official site

Indian whisky
Products introduced in 2011
Alcoholic drink brands